The 1989 Geelong Football Club season was the club's 118th season of senior competition in the Victorian Football League (VFL). Under new coach Malcolm Blight, the Cats played attractive attacking football, scoring a combined total of 2916 points during the home-and-away season to break 's record set in 1987 (2846 points).

Season summary

Regular season

Ladder

Honours

Milestones 
 Round 6 – Gary Ablett, snr (100 VFL games)

Others 
 Paul Couch won the Brownlow Medal

Notes 
 Key

 H ^ Home match.
 A ^ Away match.

 Notes
 Geelong's scores are indicated in bold font.

References

External links 
 Official website of the Geelong Football Club
 Official website of the Australian Football League

1989
Geelong Football Club